Chuk Yuen or Chuk Yuen Village is a village in Ta Kwu Ling, North District, Hong Kong.

Administration
Chuk Yuen is a recognized village under the New Territories Small House Policy. It is one of the villages represented within the Ta Kwu Ling District Rural Committee. For electoral purposes, Chuk Yuen is part of the Sha Ta constituency, which is currently represented by Ko Wai-kei.

History
At the time of the 1911 census, the population of Chuk Yuen was 44. The number of males was 18.

References

Villages in North District, Hong Kong